Spinal osteoarthropathy (also known as Charcot's disease) is a rare disease affecting reptiles (including snakes and lizards) which causes abnormal bone growth on vertebrae, giving the reptile a lumpy appearance.

The movement of reptiles with this ailment appears jittery and wooden, and the head movement will be greatly restricted. The condition worsens as the patient ages; the end result is a reptile fused together by its own bones. They are usually euthanized well before this stage, but in general these animals can live their short lives comfortably with little pain.
Spinal osteoarthropathy can also occur in humans.

Causes

Spinal osteoarthropathy is genetic, carried by parents and passed onto their offspring. Another known cause of this disease is a vitamin B12 deficiency in the reptile, which can be treated by injecting its food with a vitamin supplement.

Housing
A reptile with spinal osteoarthropathy does not require a large vivarium. Like all vivaria it needs to be heated according to the particular reptile's needs, with a dark hiding area (e.g. a log or dark box), normal substrate and clean water for the reptile to access. It is advisable not to have anything too high for them to climb because the reptile's ability to hold onto branches (for example) is restricted; floor space is more important. It is best not to keep them with a tank-mate (especially a healthy one), since bullying may occur.

Feeding 

Reptiles with this condition are usually fed small rodents (e.g. mice) which are small, easy to swallow and easily injectable with vitamin supplements.
Animals with this condition find it more difficult to eat (especially snakes, whose bony growths compromise their ability to manipulate food down their throat).

Handling 
Handling may be painful and stressful because of their poor body movement and how the bones have grown. Due to the stress, handling should be kept to a minimum.

References

External links
Review of the literature and report on two cases

Reptile diseases
Snakes